Music for Perla is a solo album by pianist Tete Montoliu recorded in 1974 and released on the Danish label SteepleChase.

Reception

Ken Dryden of AllMusic states, "Beautifully recorded in a bright-sounding studio with a first-rate piano, this CD is a great example of Tete Montoliu's abilities early in his recording career."

Track listing
All compositions by Tete Montoliu except as indicated
 "Yesterdays" (Otto Harbach, Jerome Kern)6:07
 "Here's That Rainy Day" (Johnny Burke, Jimmy Van Heusen)5:11
 "Margareta" (Perry Robinson)4:57
 "Imagination" (Burke, Van Heusen)5:11
 "Have You Met Miss Jones?" (Lorenz Hart, Richard Rodgers)4:05
 "I Feel All Alone"2:50
 "What Is It?"1:15
 "Circe"2:33
 "Gentofte 4349"2:31
 "Apartment 512"11:23

Personnel
Tete Montoliu – piano

References

Tete Montoliu albums
1974 albums
SteepleChase Records albums
Solo piano jazz albums